Region Varde Elitesport and Outrup Speedway Club is a speedway club southwest of Outrup in Denmark, who compete in the Danish Speedway League.

History
Outrup Speedway Club was founded in November 1973 and the speedway track was opened on 3 July 1976. In 1986, a new stadium opened which was adjacent to the old one and is currently located at the Outrup Speedway Center, Hennevej 35, 6855 Outrup.

In 2015, the club changed its name from the Outrup Speedway Club to Region Varde Elitesport. 

The team have won the Danish Speedway League title on 5 occasions in 1985, 1999, 2001, 2016 and 2018

Teams

2022 team

References 

Danish speedway teams